Xin Hwa Holdings Berhad is a Malaysian publicly traded company. It provides logistics services in Malaysia and Singapore.

Subsidiaries
Xin Hwa Trading & Transport Sdn Bhd
Xin Hwa Auto Engineering Sdn Bhd
Canggih Logistik Sdn Bhd
XH Universal Forwarding Sdn Bhd
Xin Hwa Integrated Logistics Pte Ltd

External links
 

Companies listed on Bursa Malaysia
Transport companies established in 2013
Transport companies of Malaysia
Holding companies of Malaysia
Malaysian companies established in 2013
Holding companies established in 2013
Johor Bahru